Three Castles Walk may refer to:
 Three Castles Walk, Monmouthshire, the footpath in Wales
 Corvedale Three Castles Walk, the footpath in Shropshire
 Three Castles Path, the footpath in Southern England